Abtenau (Central Bavarian: Obtenau) is a market town in the Hallein District of Salzburg in Austria. The municipality is located in Lammertal, Tennengau, about 45 km south of Salzburg, and encompasses the entire middle valley of the Lammer.

Geography
Abtenau lies in the Lammer river valley (Lammertal) about 45 km south of Salzburg.

Climate

Population

The municipal area comprises the following 23 villages (in brackets population as of 1 January 2019):

Sister towns
  Big Bear Lake (California, United States)
  Münster (Hesse, Germany)

References

Cities and towns in Hallein District
Tennen Mountains
Dachstein Mountains